The Nevada State Museum, Las Vegas located at the Springs Preserve, in Las Vegas, Nevada is one of 7 Nevada State Museums operated by the Nevada Department of Tourism and Cultural Affairs. The name was changed from the Nevada State Museum and Historical Society in 2008 when the museum moved from Lorenzi Park in Las Vegas to the Springs Preserve campus.  The museum houses items from the development of Las Vegas as well as the natural history of the area. The museum is open Tuesday through Sunday, 9 am to 5 pm, closed Thanksgiving and Christmas.

Accreditation 
The Nevada State Museum, Las Vegas is accredited by the American Alliance of Museums.

First location
The 1982 museum was located in Lorenzi Park but was moved into a new building on the campus of the Springs Preserve in Las Vegas, where it opened in October 2011.

Current location
The museum opened in October 2011, in a building completed in 2009 on the campus of the Springs Preserve in Las Vegas .  The building remained unused for two years as a result of state budget constraints from the 2008 economic slowdown.  The new building has 11,000 square feet of permanent exhibit space.  It houses exhibits on regional and natural history with a 13-foot articulated mammoth skeleton and an in-depth treatment of Las Vegas history. Admission for children 17 and younger is free.

Exhibits 
In 2021, the Nevada State museum held a program featuring the Folies Bergere at The Tropicana Hotel Las Vegas.The Tropicana Hotel donated many Folies Bergere costumes to the museum for its collection.

See also 

 Nevada State Museum, Carson City

References

Museums in Las Vegas
History museums in Nevada
Natural history museums in Nevada
Institutions accredited by the American Alliance of Museums
Buildings and structures completed in 2009
2011 establishments in Nevada